Against the Wind is the eleventh studio album by American rock singer Bob Seger and his fourth which credits the Silver Bullet Band.  Like many of his albums, about half of the tracks feature the Muscle Shoals Rhythm Section as backing musicians.  It was released in February 1980.  It is Seger's only number-one album to date, spending six weeks at the top of the Billboard Top LPs chart, knocking Pink Floyd's The Wall from the top spot.

Release
Against the Wind was an immediate commercial success, reaching No. 2 on the Billboard 200 album chart in its third week and remaining there for five weeks behind Pink Floyd's The Wall before reaching No. 1 and holding the top position for six weeks. By late 1981 the album sold 3.7 million copies in the United States and was certified 5× platinum by the Recording Industry Association of America in 2003.

Bob Seger and the Silver Bullet Band won the 1980 Grammy Award for Best Rock Performance by a Duo or Group with Vocal for the album Against the Wind and Capitol Records art director Roy Kohara won the Grammy Award for Best Recording Package.

Critical reception
Rock critic Dave Marsh, writing for Rolling Stone, strongly criticized the album as a betrayal of Seger's longtime fans: "I'd like to say that this is not only the worst record Bob Seger has ever made, but an absolutely cowardly one as well" saying that Seger had crafted "failureproof songs that are utterly listenable and quite meaningless." Marsh had followed Seger since before Night Moves, when Seger finally gained national fame, and said in his review that Seger's long, tireless struggle to stardom is trivialized by this record. "He had to fight hard to prove there was still a place in rock & roll for a guy like him, and, with Night Moves, he won.  This is the LP that makes such a victory meaningless ... It makes me sad, and it makes me angry (another emotion that's disappeared here, though it's often fueled Seger's finest work)."

Marsh did concede that on the album "Seger sings fantastically well" and called it a "carefully constructed album." A review in The Boston Phoenix echoed some of Marsh's criticisms, saying that Seger offered nothing that hadn't been heard before or equaled his best work, "only heavy-handed efforts to simulate it."

In a more positive review in the Los Angeles Times, critic Robert Hilburn said the album was "close to [Seger's] earlier works" but represented a "mastering of the form" and that the reflective ballads stood out. John Rockwell of The New York Times called it an "honest, attractive album" and a "nice return to his Night Moves form."

Seger himself said the album "is about trying to move ahead, keeping your sanity and integrity at the same time."

Track listing

The Silver Bullet Band plays on side one tracks 1–3 and on side two tracks 1 & 3.

The Muscle Shoals Rhythm Section plays on side one tracks 4 & 5 and on side two tracks 2, 4, & 5.

Personnel

 Bob Seger – guitar, vocals, background vocals, guitar solos on "The Horizontal Bop" (intro and outro) and "Her Strut", outro guitar solo on "No Man's Land"

The Silver Bullet Band

Drew Abbott – guitar, central guitar solo on "The Horizontal Bop" 
Chris Campbell – bass 
Alto Reed – saxophone on "The Horizontal Bop", "Betty Lou's Gettin' Out Tonight" and "Shinin' Brightly"
David Teegarden – drums, percussion

Muscle Shoals Rhythm Section
Barry Beckett – piano on "No Man's Land", "Long Twin Silver Line", "Good for Me", "Fire Lake", "Shinin' Brightly"
Pete Carr – guitar on "No Man's Land", "Long Twin Silver Line" (including solos), "Good for Me", "Fire Lake", "Shinin' Brightly"
Roger Hawkins – drums, percussion on "No Man's Land", "Long Twin Silver Line", "Good for Me", "Fire Lake", "Shinin' Brightly"
David Hood – bass on "No Man's Land", "Long Twin Silver Line", "Good for Me", "Fire Lake", "Shinin' Brightly"
Jimmy Johnson – guitar on "No Man's Land", "Long Twin Silver Line", "Good for Me", "Fire Lake", "Shinin' Brightly"
Randy McCormick – organ on "No Man's Land", "Long Twin Silver Line", "Good for Me", "Fire Lake", "Shinin' Brightly"

Additional musicians
Ginger Blake – backing vocals on "You'll Accomp'ny Me" "Good For Me" and "Shinin' Brightly"
Sam Clayton – percussion on "You'll Accomp'ny Me"
Laura Creamer – backing vocals on "You'll Accomp'ny Me" "Good For Me" and "Shinin' Brightly"
Linda Dillard – backing vocals on "You'll Accomp'ny Me" "Good For Me" and "Shinin' Brightly"
Glenn Frey – harmony vocals on "Fire Lake" and "Against the Wind"
Paul Harris – piano on "Against the Wind" and "Betty Lou's Gettin' Out Tonight", organ on "Against the Wind"
Don Henley – harmony vocals on "Fire Lake"
Dr. John – keyboards on "The Horizontal Bop"
Bill Payne – organ, synthesizer, piano on "You'll Accomp'ny Me"
Doug Riley – synthesizer on "No Man's Land"
Timothy B. Schmit – harmony vocals on "Fire Lake"

Production 

Punch Andrews – producer, mixer
John Arrias – engineer, mixer
Tom Bert –  photography
Roy Kohara – art direction
Steve Melton – producer, engineer, mixer
Muscle Shoals Rhythm Section – producer, mixer
Bob Seger – producer, mixer
Bill Szymczyk – producer, engineer, mixer
Wally Traugott – mastering
Punch Andrews - 1999 remastering
Robert Vosgien – 2003 remastering
Jim Warren – paintings

Charts

Weekly charts

Year-end charts

Awards
Grammy Awards

Certifications

See also
Muscle Shoals, Alabama
Muscle Shoals Rhythm Section
Muscle Shoals Sound Studios

References

Bob Seger albums
1980 albums
Albums produced by Bill Szymczyk
Albums produced by Punch Andrews
Albums recorded at Muscle Shoals Sound Studio
Capitol Records albums